A Better Understanding is an album by saxophonist Sonny Fortune which was recorded in 1995 and released on the Blue Note label.

Reception

The AllMusic review by Scott Yanow stated "On the fine all-round A Better Understanding session, Sonny Fortune is mostly in the spotlight. Although generally playing alto, Fortune is also heard on soprano and flute ... While not one of Fortune's most essential releases (one wishes that he had played some tenor too), A Better Understanding has enough variety and surprises to make it recommended". On All About Jazz, Florence Wetzell noted "A Better Understanding, features nine Fortune originals and is an embarrassment of riches, with one excellent song after another and top-notch accompaniment".

Track listing
All compositions by Sonny Fortune 
 "Mind Games" – 6:38
 "Laying It Down" – 7:48
 "Awakening" – 6:58
 "A Swing Touch" – 7:04
 "Never Again Is Such a Long Time" – 4:07
 "It Ain't What It Was" – 5:30
 "It's a Bird" – 6:16
 "Tribute to a Holiday" – 6:10
 "Long Before Our Mothers Cried" – 6:45

Personnel
Sonny Fortune – alto saxophone, soprano saxophone, alto flute, flute
Jerry González – trumpet, flugelhorn, congas (tracks 3. 7 & 9)
Robin Eubanks – trombone (tracks 3, 7 & 9)
Kenny Barron – piano 
Wayne Dockery – bass 
Ronnie Burrage (tracks 1 & 9), Billy Hart (tracks 2-4 & 6-8) – drums 
Steve Berrios – percussion (tracks 3 & 9)

References

Sonny Fortune albums
1995 albums
Blue Note Records albums
Albums recorded at Van Gelder Studio